Matilda Lawler is an American actress best known for starring roles in the film Flora & Ulysses and the HBO Max miniseries Station Eleven.

Early life
Lawler was born in 2008 to parents Matthew and Mara Lawler, who themselves are actors.

Career
Lawler's first acting role was in a stage production of Jack and Annie at Hoboken Children's Theater when she was in the first grade. She made her Broadway debut in The Ferryman (2018).

When Lawler was nine years old, she starred in the play The Net Will Appear, in which she played a nine-year-old who becomes friends with a 70-year-old. The actor who played the latter character, Richard Masur, became Lawler's mentor and best friend. She tapped into their relationship for the emotions needed to portray her character in Station Eleven.

For her work in Station Eleven, The New Yorker called Lawler "a gifted performer."

Filmography

Film

Television

Theatre

Awards and nominations

References

External links

Living people
21st-century American actresses
American child actresses
American film actresses
American television actresses
Place of birth missing (living people)
2008 births